Sean Alvarez (born July 14, 1971) is an American retired mixed martial artist and grappler. He competed in the Heavyweight division. An accomplished grappler, Alvarez won gold medals at the Brazilian jiu-jitsu World Championships and the Pan American Championships as well three-silver medals at the ADCC Submission Wrestling World Championship. In MMA, he competed for the UFC, King of the Cage, and RINGS.



MMA career
Sean Alvarez started his MMA career in 1996, taking part in "U: Japan  " event. He defeated japanese prowresler Yoji Anjo via submission. He losS to russian sambo master Oleg Taktarov in 1997. At the same year he made debut in  RINGS and hold win over Willie Peters and Wataru Sakata. After two years break he took part in KOTC 9: Showtime and loss to Eric Pele. In 2003 he made debut in UFC and loss to Wesley Correira at UFC 42

Grappling
Alvarez took part in 1998 ADCC World Championships at +99 weight category. After defeating Nader Ghaith, Brad Anderson, Simon Siasi he met Ricco Rodriguez in final match and loss by decision and won a silver medal. Next year He took part in 1999 ADCC World Championships. He defeated Garth Taylor, Ricco Rodriguez and Luis Roberto Duarte and loss to Mark Kerr and again won a silver medal. At 2000 ADCC World Championships Alvarez defeated Carlos Barreto, Ricco Rodriguez and Tito Ortiz and again loss to Mark Kerr in final match at absolute weight category  and third time won a silver medal. In 2001 he won Luis Castello Branco and Marcio Cruz and loss to Jeff Monson at +99 weight category and loss to Mike Van Arsdale in absolute weight category. In 2003 Alvarez defeated Christoph Midoux and loss to Alex Paz.

After retirement
After retirement Alvarez works as coach and organizes BJJ seminars.

Mixed martial arts record

|-
| Loss
| align=center| 4–3
| Wesley Correira
| TKO (knees and punches)
| UFC 42
| 
| align=center| 2
| align=center| 1:46
| Miami, Florida, United States
| 
|-
| Win
| align=center| 4–2
| Mike Radnov
| Submission (rear naked choke)
| UCC 10: Battle for the Belts 2002
| 
| align=center| 2
| align=center| 2:02
| Hull, Quebec, Canada
| 
|-
| Loss
| align=center| 3–2
| Eric Pele
| KO
| KOTC 9: Showtime
| 
| align=center| 3
| align=center| 0:27
| San Jacinto, California, United States
| 
|-
| Win
| align=center| 3–1
| Wataru Sakata
| Decision
| RINGS: Final Capture
| 
| align=center| 3
| align=center| 5:00
| Japan
| 
|-
| Win
| align=center| 2–1
| Willie Peeters
| N/A
| RINGS: Mega Battle Tournament 1997 Semifinal
| 
| align=center| 1
| align=center| 9:40
| Japan
| 
|-
| Loss
| align=center| 1–1
| Oleg Taktarov
| KO (punches)
| Pentagon Combat: Pentagon Combat
| 
| align=center| 1
| align=center| 0:52
| Brazil
| 
|-
| Win
| align=center| 1–0
| Yoji Anjo
| TKO (submission to punches)
| U: Japan
| 
| align=center| 1
| align=center| 34:26
| Japan
|

Submission grappling record
{| class="wikitable sortable" style="font-size:80%; text-align:left;"
|-
| colspan=8 style="text-align:center;" | ? Matches, ? Wins (? Submissions), ? Losses (? Submissions), ? Draws
|-
!  Result
!  style="text-align:center;"| Rec.
!  Opponent
!  Method
!  Event
!  Division
!  Date
!  Location
|-
|Loss
|style="text-align:center;"|15–6–0
| Alex Negao
| Decision points
|2003 ADCC World Championships
| Over 99 
|May 17, 2003
|Abu Dhabi, United Arab Emirates
|-
|Win
|style="text-align:center;"|15–5–0
| Christoph Midoux
| Decision points
|2003 ADCC World Championships
| Over 99 
|May 17, 2003
|Abu Dhabi, United Arab Emirates
|-
|Loss
|style="text-align:center;"|14–5–0
| Mike Van Arsdale
| Decision points
|2001 ADCC World Championships
|Absolute 
|April 11, 2001
|Abu Dhabi, United Arab Emirates
|-
|Loss
|style="text-align:center;"|14–4–0
| Jeff Monson
| Decision points
|2001 ADCC World Championships
| Over 99 
|April 11, 2001
|Abu Dhabi, United Arab Emirates
|-
|Win
|style="text-align:center;"|14–3–0
| Marcio Cruz
| Decision points
|2001 ADCC World Championships
| Over 99 
|April 11, 2001
|Abu Dhabi, United Arab Emirates
|-
|Win
|style="text-align:center;"|13–3–0
| Luis Castello Branco
| Decision points
|2001 ADCC World Championships
|  Over 99 
|April 11, 2001
|Abu Dhabi, United Arab Emirates
|-
|Loss
|style="text-align:center;"|12–3–0
| Mark Kerr
| Decision points
|2000 ADCC World Championships
|Absolute 
|March 1, 2000
|Abu Dhabi, United Arab Emirates
|-
|Win
|style="text-align:center;"|12–2–0
| Tito Ortiz
| Decision points
|2000 ADCC World Championships
|Absolute 
|March 1, 2000
|Abu Dhabi, United Arab Emirates
|-
|Win
|style="text-align:center;"|11–2–0
| Ricco Rodriguez
| Decision points
|2000 ADCC World Championships
|Absolute 
|March 1, 2000
|Abu Dhabi, United Arab Emirates
|-
|Win
|style="text-align:center;"|10–2–0
| Carlos Barreto
| Decision points
|2000 ADCC World Championships
|Absolute 
|March 1, 2000
|Abu Dhabi, United Arab Emirates
|-
|Loss
|style="text-align:center;"|9–2–0
| Mark Kerr
| Decision points
|1999 ADCC World Championships
|Over 99
|February 24, 1999
|Abu Dhabi, United Arab Emirates
|-
|Win
|style="text-align:center;"|9–1–0
| Luis Roberto Duarte
| Decision points
|1999 ADCC World Championships
|Over 99
|February 24, 1999
|Abu Dhabi, United Arab Emirates
|-
|Win
|style="text-align:center;"|8–1–0
| Ricco Rodriguez
| Decision points
|1999 ADCC World Championships
|Over 99
|February 24, 1999
|Abu Dhabi, United Arab Emirates
|-
|Win
|style="text-align:center;"|7–1–0
| Garth Taylor
| Decision points
|1999 ADCC World Championships
|Over 99
|February 24, 1999
|Abu Dhabi, United Arab Emirates
|-
|Loss
|style="text-align:center;"|6–1–0
| Ricco Rodriguez
| Decision points
|1998 ADCC World Championships
|Over 99
|March 20, 1998
|Abu Dhabi, United Arab Emirates
|-
|Win
|style="text-align:center;"|6–0–0
| Simon Siasi
| Decision points
|1998 ADCC World Championships
|Over 99
|March 20, 1998
|Abu Dhabi, United Arab Emirates
|-
|Win
|style="text-align:center;"|5–0–0
| Brad Anderson
| Armbar
|1998 ADCC World Championships
|Over 99
|March 20, 1998
|Abu Dhabi, United Arab Emirates
|-
|Win
|style="text-align:center;"|4–0–0
| Nader Ghaith
| Choke
|1998 ADCC World Championships
|Over 99
|March 20, 1998
|Abu Dhabi, United Arab Emirates
|-
|Win
|style="text-align:center;"|3–0–0
| Alex Paz
| -
|1997 IBJJF World Jiu-Jitsu Championship
|Over 99
|July 25, 1997
|Rio de Janeiro, Brazil
|-
|Win
|style="text-align:center;"|2–0–0
| Alberto Lima Vieira
| -
|1996 Pan Jiu-Jitsu IBJJF Championship
|Heavyweight 
|April 2, 1996
|Rio de Janeiro, Brazil
|-
|Win
|style="text-align:center;"|1–0–0
| Garth Taylor
| -
|1996 Pan Jiu-Jitsu IBJJF Championship
|Heavyweight 
|January 1, 1996
|Los Angeles, California, United States
|-

References

External links
 
 

1971 births
Living people
American male mixed martial artists
Heavyweight mixed martial artists
Mixed martial artists utilizing Brazilian jiu-jitsu
American practitioners of Brazilian jiu-jitsu
Ultimate Fighting Championship male fighters